The 1983 Utah Utes football team was an American football team that represented the University of Utah as a member of the Western Athletic Conference (WAC) during the 1983 NCAA Division I-A football season. In their second season under head coach Chuck Stobart, the Utes compiled an overall record of 5–6 with a mark of 4–4 against conference opponents, placing in a three-way tie for fifth in the WAC. Home games were played on campus at Robert Rice Stadium in Salt Lake City.

Schedule

After the season

NFL Draft
One Utah player was selected in the 1984 NFL Draft.

References

Utah
Utah Utes football seasons
Utah Utes football